is a prefecture of Japan located on the island of Kyushu and the Ryukyu Islands. Kagoshima Prefecture has a population of 1,599,779 (1 January 2020) and has a geographic area of 9,187 km2 (3,547 sq mi). Kagoshima Prefecture borders Kumamoto Prefecture to the north and Miyazaki Prefecture to the northeast.

Kagoshima is the capital and largest city of Kagoshima Prefecture, with other major cities including Kirishima, Kanoya, and Satsumasendai. Kagoshima Prefecture is located at the southernmost point of Kyūshū and includes the Satsunan Islands group of the Ryukyu Islands. Kagoshima Prefecture's mainland territory extends from the Ariake Sea to Shibushi Bay on the Pacific Ocean coast, and is characterized by two large peninsulas created by Kagoshima Bay. Kagoshima Prefecture formed the core of the Satsuma Domain, ruled from Kagoshima Castle, one of the most important Japanese domains of the Edo period and the Meiji Restoration.

History 

Kagoshima Prefecture corresponds to the ancient Japanese provinces Ōsumi and Satsuma, including the northern part of the Ryukyu Islands (Satsunan). This region played a key role in the Meiji Restoration (Saigō Takamori), and the city of Kagoshima was an important naval base during Japan's 20th century wars and the home of admiral Tōgō Heihachirō.
More recent incidents are the sinking of a North Korean spy ship (100 ton class) in 2001 by the Coast Guard, which was later salvaged and exhibited in Tokyo, and the abduction of an office clerk from a Kagoshima beach in 1978 by agents from the same country. This became known only recently under the Koizumi administration.

Demographics 
The two main ethnic groups of Kagoshima Prefecture are the Japanese and the Ryukyuans (Amami Islands).

Geography 
Kagoshima Prefecture is located at the southwest tip of Kyushu on the Satsuma Peninsula and Ōsumi Peninsula. This prefecture also includes a chain of islands stretching further to the southwest of Kyushu for a few hundred kilometers. The most important group is the Amami Islands. Surrounded by the East China Sea to the west, Okinawa Prefecture in the south, Kumamoto Prefecture to the north, and Miyazaki Prefecture to the east, it has  of coastline (including the 28 islands). It has a bay called Kagoshima Bay (Kinkowan), which is sandwiched by two peninsulas, Satsuma and Ōsumi. Its position made it a 'gateway' to Japan at various times in history. While Kyushu has about 13 million people, there are less than 2 million in this prefecture.

The prefecture boasts a chain of active and dormant volcanoes, including the great Sakurajima, which towers out of the Kagoshima bay opposite Kagoshima city. A steady trickle of smoke and ash emerges from the caldera, punctuated by louder mini-eruptions on an almost daily basis. On active days in Kagoshima city an umbrella is advisable to ward off the ash. Sakurajima is one of Japan's most active volcanoes. Major eruptions occurred in 1914, when the island mountain spilled enough material to become permanently connected to the mainland, and a lesser eruption in 1960. Volcanic materials in the soil make Sakurajima a source for record daikon radishes, roughly the size of a basketball. Many beaches around the Kagoshima Bay are littered with well-worn pumice stones. A crater lake in the southwestern tip of the prefecture, near the spa town of Ibusuki, is home to a rare species of giant eel.

As of 31 March 2019, 13% of the total land area of the prefecture was designated as Natural Parks, namely the Amami Guntō, Kirishima-Kinkowan, Unzen-Amakusa, and Yakushima National Parks; Koshikishima and Nichinan Kaigan Quasi-National Parks; and Akune, Bōnoma, Fukiagehama, Imutaike, Ōsumi Nanbu, Sendaigawa Ryūiki, Takakumayama, and Tokara Rettō Prefectural Natural Parks.

Economy
Most of the economic sector is focused in Kagoshima City and the surrounding area, corresponding to the extent of the former Satsuma Province. The eastern part of the prefecture, the former Ōsumi Province, is mostly rural and shows a general population decline.

The prefecture has strong agricultural roots, which are reflected in its most well-known exports: green tea, sweet potato, radish, Pongee rice, Satsuma ware, Berkshire pork ("kurobuta") and local Black Wagyu beef. Kagoshima prefecture's production of bonito flakes is second only to that of Shizuoka. In addition, it produces Japan's largest volume of unagi eels. Kagoshima is also largest beef and pork producing prefecture in Japan.

The Japan Aerospace Exploration Agency (JAXA) has several facilities within the prefecture, including the country's main launch facility on Tanegashima and the Uchinoura Space Center.

The prefecture's gross domestic product is approximately 5,548.7 trillion yen, with a work force of about 791,000 people (2018)

Municipalities

The following is a list of Kagoshima Prefecture's cities, and its administrative districts with their constituent towns and villages:

Cities

Nineteen cities are located in Kagoshima Prefecture:

Districts 
These are the towns and villages in each district:

Mergers

Culture

Food
Kagoshima Prefecture has a distinct and rich food culture. The warm weather and diverse environments allow for the agriculture and aquaculture of Kagoshima to thrive. Numerous restaurants around Kagoshima feature Satsuma Province local cuisine. Popular cuisine incorporating local agriculture include sweet potato, kibinago sashimi (silver-striped herring), buri amberjack, kampachi yellowtail, "Black Label Products" such as kuro-ushi Wagyu beef, kuro-buta Berkshire pork dishes, and kuro-Satsuma jidori chicken (sometimes served as raw, chicken sashimi); smoked eel, keihan, and miki (fermented rice milk consumed among residents of the Amami Islands).

Satsuma-age 
Satsuma-age, or deep-fried fish cake, comes in great variety in Kagoshima. Though the deep-fried fishcake can be found throughout the country, the Satsuma Domain (modern-day Kagoshima Prefecture) is commonly believed to be the birthplace of the snack. It is said, though, the concept was introduced from the Ryūkyū Kingdom (modern-day Okinawa Prefecture) by Satsuma Lord, Nariakira Shimazu.

Sweets 
Traditional treats outside of Seika Food Co., Ltd. products include karukan (sweet cakes made from steamed yams and rice flour), jambo-mochi, kokutō brown sugar from the Amami Islands, getanha brown sugar cake, etc.

Beverages 
Kagoshima Prefecture is officially recognized (by the World Trade Organization) as the home to one of the most traditional beverages of Japan, shōchū. In Kagoshima there are 113+ distilleries, producing about 1,500 highly acclaimed brands, placing Kagoshima in the top for production quantity and shipment. While visiting Kagoshima, one may notice labels reading . Honkaku-shōchū is a distilled beverage produced with traditional skills using ingredients such as natural spring water, sweet potatoes, locally grown sugar cane, and grains. Varieties of honkaku-shōchū include , shōchū distilled from sweet potatoes, distilled from barley, and  distilled from rice. Shōchū has long gained international favor and has come to be comparable to Bordeaux for wine, Scotch for whiskey, and Cognac for brandy. Also, the Amami Islands of Kagoshima Prefecture are the only areas sanctioned to bear the label of kokutō-shōchū.

 or black vinegar is another item of the "Black Label Products" of Kagoshima, the other of which is Kokutō-shōchū. There are a number of kurozu farms around Kagoshima, most of which are located around the Kirishima area. Most kurozu farms produce kurozu bottled vinegar (fermented for a single year, 2+ years) along with other items such as salad dressing, powders, capsules, spices, candy, etc. Kurozu also comes in different flavors such as grape, orange, ume plum, etc. though the most popular flavor by far is apple. The farms are open to visitations and often offer tours.

Dialect 

For the most part, Satsugū dialect is mutually unintelligible with Standard Japanese, though most Satsugū speakers know both as a result of language standardization in Japan.

Sport and recreation

Kagoshima Rebnise, a professional basketball team, was founded in 2003 and currently competes in the second division of the national B.League. Kagoshima United FC, a soccer team, was founded in 2014 and competes in the J3 League. Although no major professional baseball teams are based in the prefecture, a number of Kagoshima's ballparks have hosted the spring training camps of Nippon Professional Baseball teams:

Kamoike Ballpark, previous camp home of the Chiba Lotte Marines (NPB) and Lotte Giants (KBO League). Also hosts regular season games.

Ibusuki Municipal Ballpark (指宿市営球場), camp home of the Kokutesu Swallows
Yunomoto Ballpark (湯之元球場), camp home of the Yakult Atoms
Kagoshima Kamoike Stadium, camp home of Júbilo Iwata (soccer) and Toshiba Brave Lupus (rugby)
, camp home of Sagan Tosu (soccer)

The Kirishima-Yaku National Park is located in Kagoshima Prefecture.

Education

Universities and colleges
Kagoshima University
National Institute of Fitness and Sports in Kanoya
The International University of Kagoshima
Kagoshima Immaculate Heart University
Daiichi Institute of Technology
Shigakukan University
Kagoshima Prefectural College
Kagoshima Immaculate Heart College
Kagoshima Women's Junior College
Daiichi Junior College of Infant Education

High schools

Science and technology facilities
 Tanegashima Space Center
 Uchinoura Space Center

Museums
 Bansei Tokkō Peace Museum
 Chiran Peace Museum for Kamikaze Pilots
 Museum of the Meiji Restoration
 Reimeikan, Kagoshima Prefectural Center for Historical Material
 Uenohara site

Transportation

Rail
JR Kyushu
Kyushu Shinkansen
Kagoshima Line
Nippō Main Line
Ibusuki Makurazaki Line
Hisatsu Line
Kitto Line
Hisatsu Orange Railway

Trams
Kagoshima City Tram

Roads

Expressways and toll roads
Kyushu Expressway
Miyazaki Expressway
Ibusuki Toll Road
Minamikyushu Expressway
Higashikyushu Expressway (Hayato Road)

National Highways
National Route 3 (Kitakyushu–Fukuoka–Kurume–Kumamoto–Minamata-Izumi-Satsuma Sendai-Kagoshima)
National Route 10 (Kitakyushu-Nakatsu–Beppu–Saiki–Nobeoka–Miyazaki–Miyakonojo-Kagoshima)
National Route 58 (disconnected segments in downtown Kagoshima and on the islands of Tanegashima and Amami Ōshima)
Route 220 (Miyazaki-Nichinan-Shibushi-Kanoya-Tarumizu-Kirishima)
Route 223
Route 224
Route 225
Route 226
Route 267 (Hitoyoshi-Isa-Satsuma Sendai)
Route 268 (Minamata-Isa-Ebino–Kobayashi-Miyazaki)
Route 269
Route 270
Route 328 (Kagoshima-Isa-Izumi)
Route 389 (Ōmuta–Tamana–Unzen–Minamishimabara–Amakusa-Akune)
Route 447 (Ebino-Isa-Izumi)
Route 448
Route 499
Route 504 (Kanoya-Kirishima-Satsuma-Izumi)

Ports
Kagoshima Port
Domestic ferry route to Sakurajima, Kikai Island, Tokunoshima, Amami Island, Tanegashima, Yakushima, Yoron Island, Okinoerabu and Naha.
High-speed craft route to Ibusuki, Tanegashima and Yakushima.
International container hub port
Shibushi Port
Ferry route to Osaka, Tokyo, Naha and Amami Island
International and domestic container hub port
Naze Port
Ferry Route to Osaka, Kobe, Kagoshima, Yakushima, Tanegashima, Tokunoshima and Naha.
Yakushima Port
Tanegashima Port
Tokunoshima Port

Airports
Kagoshima Airport
Amami Airport
Tokunoshima Airport
Tanegashima Airport
Yakushima Airport
Okinoerabu Airport
Yoron Airport

Notable people

Isamu Akasaki, physicist and engineer, Nobel Prize in Physics laureate
Hajime Chitose, singer
Hayato Tani, actor
Yasuhito Endo, football player
Kosuke Fukudome, MLB player
GO!GO!7188, rock band
Masazumi Harada, doctor
Goyō Hashiguchi, artist
Utami Hayashishita, professional wrestler
Tōgō Heihachirō, admiral of the fleet in the Imperial Japanese Navy
Kota Ibushi, professional Wrestler
Kazuo Inamori, industrialist turned philanthropist
Junichi Inamoto, football player
Takehiko Inoue, modern comic artist
Shinobu Kaitani, modern comic artist
Yuki Kashiwagi, AKB48 member
Kunio Kato animator known especially for La Maison en Petits Cubes
Yoichiro Kawaguchi, computer graphics artist
Munenori Kawasaki, MLB player
Kohei Miyauchi, voice actor
Sakura Miyawaki, HKT48 and Iz*One member
Mika Nakashima, artist
Shimazu Nariakira, feudal lord
Yuya Osako, football player
Robico, manga artist
Jirō Sakagami, comedian
Hiroyuki Sakai, Iron Chef cook
Hitoshi Sakimoto, composer
Nanami Sakuraba, actress
Tokichi Setoguchi, composer
Yoku Shioya, voice actor
Kawasaki Shōzō, founder of Kawasaki Heavy Industries
Kento Tachibanada, football player
Nabi Tajima, oldest Japanese and Asian person ever, last living person born in the 19th century
Saigō Takamori, samurai
Seiji Tōgō, artist
Ōkubo Toshimichi, statesman
Yoshiyuki Tsuruta, swimmer, Olympic Games double gold medalist
Wowaka, singer

Mythical creatures
Garappa (Kappa)
Issie
Ittan-momen

Sister relations

Jeollabuk-do, South Korea, October 1989 duo-declaration
Georgia, United States November 28, 1966, became a sister state
Jiangsu, China
Gifu Prefecture July 27, 1971, became a sister prefecture

See also

 2006 Kuril Islands earthquake
 Sakurajima radish
 Kagoshima dialect
 Amami language, Kunigami language

Notes

References
 Nussbaum, Louis-Frédéric and Käthe Roth. (2005).  Japan Encyclopedia. Cambridge, Massachusetts: Harvard University Press. ; ; .

External links

 
 
 Official Kagoshima Prefecture website 
 Official Kagoshima Prefecture Promotional Website 
 National Archives of Japan  ... Kagoshima map (1891)

 
Kyushu region
Prefectures of Japan